Samuel Dopping (1671 – 17 September 1720) was an Anglo-Irish politician. 

Dopping was the Member of Parliament for Armagh Borough in the Irish House of Commons between 1695 and 1715. In 1711 he was made a member of the Privy Council of Ireland. He then represented Dublin University from 1715 until his death. In parliament, Dopping was initially aligned to the Whig faction, but exercised increasing independence, particularly in defence of the established Church of Ireland and opposition to the amendment of Irish bills by the British Privy Council.

References

1671 births
1720 deaths
17th-century Anglo-Irish people
18th-century Anglo-Irish people
Irish MPs 1695–1699
Irish MPs 1703–1713
Irish MPs 1713–1714
Irish MPs 1715–1727
Members of the Parliament of Ireland (pre-1801) for County Armagh constituencies
Members of the Parliament of Ireland (pre-1801) for County Dublin constituencies
Members of the Privy Council of Ireland